The Serious Fraud Office (SFO; Māori: Te Tari Hara Tāware) is the public service department of New Zealand charged with detecting, investigating and prosecuting financial crimes, including corruption, of a serious and complex nature.

The SFO is New Zealand's lead law enforcement agency for investigating and prosecuting serious financial crime, including bribery and corruption. The Auckland-based agency has about 50 employees of which 90 percent perform front-line activities. It has statutory independence as operational decisions are made without ministerial direction. The agency is based upon its UK counterpart as established by the Serious Fraud Office Act 1990. The SFO was established as a response to the collapse of the capital markets following the stock market crash in 1987.

Investigation procedures

Suspects questioned by the SFO have no right to silence and must answer questions and produce requested evidence, even if it incriminates them. However, evidence at an interview cannot be used against a suspect at his or her trial, unless he or she gives evidence which contradicts their SFO interview. Witnesses can also be required to answer questions under compulsion. Such interviews enable people with confidentiality agreements with clients to speak freely to the SFO without fear of retribution from their clients. These provisions do not override legal professional privilege. Anyone who refuses to comply can be prosecuted and could be fined or jailed.  Prosecutions are extremely rare and no one has been jailed for this offence.

SFO directors
Since it was established in 1990, the Serious Fraud Office has had six directors. The following is a complete list:

SFO cases
Equiticorp – Founding director Allan Hawkins   sentenced to six years' imprisonment in 1992
 Fortex – CEO Graeme Thompson and CFO Michael Mullen sentenced to imprisonment in 1994
 ACC – Former Auditor-General and ACC boss, Jeff Chapman, convicted of fraudulently using documents in 1997
 Otago DHB – CIO  Michael Swann convicted of defrauding the DHB of nearly $17m and sentenced to nine years, six months' imprisonment in 2009
 Ross Asset Management – David Ross sentenced to 10 years, 10 months' imprisonment in 2013
South Canterbury Finance – Director and lawyer Edward Sullivan sentenced to home detention and community work in 2014
 Kang Huang and Others – Kang Huang sentenced to four years, seven months' imprisonment in 2018 for his part in a $54 million mortgage fraud

Proposal to replace the SFO
The Labour government announced in September 2007 that the SFO would be replaced by a new Organised Crime Agency.

However, the bill to disband the SFO was delayed by the 2008 general election, and the new Prime Minister John Key informed Parliament that the SFO would not be disbanded.

See also
Corruption in New Zealand
Crime in New Zealand
Serious Fraud Office (United Kingdom)

References

External links
 

Specialist law enforcement agencies of New Zealand
Fraud in New Zealand
1990 establishments in New Zealand
Government agencies established in 1990
New Zealand Public Service departments